Sungailiat is a city and district (kecamatan) of Bangka Regency, in the Bangka-Belitung province of Indonesia. It is also the regency seat.

It is the second-largest settlement on the island, right after the provincial capital of Pangkal Pinang. The town is located on the eastern coast of the island, about 30 kilometres north of Pangkal Pinang, to which it is connected by a paved road.

The district is further divided into 13, consisting of one 'desa/village and 12 kelurahan''/urban village.

History
The name Sungailiat is believed to derive from a toponym, using what locals call their place with an abundance of river. They once call the place Sungai Lihat, which means “seeing the river” in Malay. This name then got changed into Sungailiat so it could be easier to call. 
And like its other Bangka island counterparts, its first settlers are Bangka Malays and began to be inhabited by various people of different ethnicities, such as Chinese Indonesians.

The anniversary of Sungailiat was determined based on a governmental team meeting on June 13, 1995 as well as the results of workshop and exposes about the anniversary/birth of Sungailiat City by the Regent of the Head of the Level II Region of Bangka on November 20, 1995 and January 15, 1996. guiding the final formulation results from the formulation team who have received input and feedback either through mass communications, or direct responses from both community and traditional leaders residing there or other resources, especially supported by various data and with scientific evidence, the team shall formulate and determine that the date of founding was on the 7th of Rabiʽ al-Awwal or Rabiul Awal in 1186 H or coincides with the 27 April 1766 CE.

On 13 May 1971, Soeharto, the second president of Indonesia appointed this city as the capital of Bangka, but then cancelled, making Pangkalpinang as its capital instead until this day.

Economy

As with many settlements in the province, the economy is heavily affected by the mining and processing of tin, very abundant in the area. The locals are also engaged in fisheries and agriculture, cultivating rubber trees, pepper, and, to a lesser degree, palm oil. Small enterprises also exist, processing raw products from the aforementioned industries into light foods, like pork and fishes. and also culinary. Restaurants are rapidly growing in the areas and many tourist attractions are rapidly built and developed by both the government and the people.

Tourism

Tourism is a growing and pretty well-known sector, with several Buddhist and Taoist temples around the place and beautiful aquatic locations like the Tongaci beach, Rambak beach, Tikus Emas beach, Parai beach, Tanjung Pesona beach, the Pemali hot springs and more locations located within the boundaries of the town attracting visitors from the rest of the country.

Climate
Sungailiat has a tropical rainforest climate (Af) with heavy to very heavy rainfall year-round.

Demographics
The majority of the people in Sungailiat are Hakka Chinese and Malay. The former are considerably Buddhist, Confucians, Catholic, or Protestant, while the latter are mostly Muslim.

Currently, there are a total of 94.044 Sungailiat residents, mostly living in the Sungailiat Urban Village with a total of 22.295 people living there. The lowest density belongs to Sinar Baru Urban Village with a total of 2.659 residents.

Administrative Areas
Sungailiat, according to Bangka's official website Bangka.go.id and ranked by area is divided into:

1. Kenanga Urban Village (26,00 km²),

2. Rebo Village (19,00 km²),

3. Parit Padang Urban Village (5,09 km²),

4. Sri Menanti Urban Village (3,40 km²),

5. Sungailiat Urban Village 5,65 km²;

6. Kuday Urban Village( 5,75 km²),

7. Sinar Baru Urban Village (11,78 km²),

8. Lubuk Kelik Urban Village (8,29 km²),

9. Surya Timur Urban Village (6,77 km²),

10. Jelitik Urban Village(22,85 km²),

11. Bukit Betung Urban Village (5,07 km²),

12. Sinar Jaya Jelutung Urban Village (13,39 km²),

13. Matras Urban Village (12,25 km²)

Language

Like its other counterparts in Indonesia, its official language is Indonesian. But its local language is Bangka Malay, the same as its other counterparts in the Bangka Island. The Chinese Indonesians of Sungailiat mostly uses Hakka language since they're Hakka. Sometimes they mixed their language with Bangka Malay as well as a product of assimilation in culture.

Waste Management

Sungailiat has a coordinated waste management system currently running to keep the city clean. The final waste disposal site of Sungailiat is located in Kenanga Urban Village, 10 km from the center of Sungailiat City. The area prepared for this site is 9 hectares and 3 hectares have been used. The management uses an open dumping and composting system with an average volume of 49 m3 of organic waste per day.

To support waste management activities at the Kenanga waste disposal site, 5 bulldozers, monitoring wells, compost houses, office buildings, waste recording boards, waste gas pipes and a floor plan for the landfill site are prepared to support it.

Historical Photographs

References

Regency seats of the Bangka Belitung Islands
Districts of the Bangka Belitung Islands
Populated places in the Bangka Belitung Islands